Lasius platythorax is a species of ants belonging to the family Formicidae.

It is native to Europe.

References

platythorax
Insects described in 1991